Pentwater may refer to a community in the United States:

 Pentwater, Michigan
 Pentwater Township, Michigan